Mark Tampin (born 20 January 1992) is an English rugby union player who plays for Newcastle Falcons in the Premiership Rugby.

Mark started his career with Leeds Carnegie in 2010 remaining there for three years, during which time he featured as a dual-registered player in the National Leagues with Wharfedale and Harrogate. In 2013 he signed for Rotherham amassing more than 80 appearances. 

A switch to Jersey followed in 2016 then another to Ealing ahead of the 2017-18 season.

He remained with Ealing for two years before agreeing a move to Newcastle in Summer 2019  where he was part of the squad which won promotion from the Championship in 2019-20 season as Falcons ended the campaign undefeated with 15 victories, the league having been curtailed and ultimately cancelled on 20 March 2020 due to the COVID-19 pandemic in the United Kingdom.

His Premiership Rugby debut came on 21 November 2020 when Mark came off the bench for Logovi'i Mulipola as Falcons defeated Bath Rugby 12-19 in the opening round of the Premiership season.  On 31 May 2021 it was announced by Newcastle that he had renewed terms for a further two years and would remain with the club until at least 2023. His 50th appearance for the club came in April 2022 in the EPCR Challenge Cup against Zebre. 

Mark's grandfather was David 'Wrecker' Brooks (1924-2002) who played for Harlequins and was President of Surrey (1971-73) and later President of the RFU (1981-1982) although he is perhaps best remembered as the Tour Manager of the British Lions 1968 tour to South Africa.

References

External links
Newcastle Falcons Profile
ESPN Profile
Ultimate Rugby Profile

1992 births
Living people
Ealing Trailfinders Rugby Club players
English rugby union players
Jersey Reds players
Leeds Tykes players
Newcastle Falcons players
Rotherham Titans players
Rugby union players from Kingston upon Thames
Rugby union props